In mathematics, the Federer–Morse theorem, introduced by ,  states that if f is a surjective continuous map from a compact metric space X to a compact metric space Y, then there is a Borel subset Z of X such that f restricted to Z is a bijection from Z to Y.
Moreover, the inverse of that restriction is a Borel section of f—it is a Borel isomorphism.

See also
 Uniformization
 Hahn–Banach theorem

References

Further reading
 L. W. Baggett and Arlan Ramsay, A Functional Analytic Proof of a Selection Lemma, Can. J. Math., vol. XXXII, no 2, 1980, pp. 441–448. 

Theorems in topology